Jessica-Jane Applegate MBE (born 22 August 1996) is a British Paralympic swimmer. Applegate competes in the S14 classification for swimmers with intellectual disabilities, mainly freestyle and backstroke preferring shorter distances. She qualified for the 2012 Summer Paralympics and on 2 September, Applegate won the gold setting a Paralympic record in the S14 200m freestyle.

She was appointed Member of the Order of the British Empire (MBE) in the 2013 New Year Honours for services to swimming.

Early life
Applegate was born in 1996 in Great Yarmouth, Norfolk, England. She was diagnosed with autism spectrum disorder, and began swimming at a young age after her mother took her to Lowestoft and Oulton Broad Swimming Club. Educated at Ormiston Venture Academy, by the age of 13 she was setting regional records and was selected for a UK sporting talent programme.

Swimming career
Towards the end of 2011, Applegate was showing potential as an International competitive swimmer, setting the second-fastest world Paralympic time in the 50m and the third fastest in the 200m freestyle at the Wales Winter Open. In 2012, she entered her first overseas tournament at the Berlin Open, taking two bronzes, in the 50m and 100m freestyle. Applegate then followed her success in Berlin by taking the gold in the 200m freestyle at the 2012 British Swimming Championship in March. In taking the gold she not only finished four seconds inside the Great Britain Paralympic qualifying time but also set a new British record.

Her last major meet before the Paralympics, the 2012 British International Disability Swimming Championships, saw Applegate win three medals. She took silver in the S14 50m and 100m freestyle races, and then on the last day of the tournament, in a very tight race against Ireland's Bethany Firth, she took gold with a time of 2:15.23. Her results over the prior tournaments saw Applegate qualify for the 2012 Summer Paralympics in both the S14 200m freestyle and 100m backstroke.

In the Paralympics, Applegate's first event was the 100m backstroke on 31 August. She qualified in third place in the heats and then swam a personal best of 1:09.58 in the final to finish just outside the medals in fourth place. In her favoured 200m freestyle, Applegate qualified for the final in first place with a time of 2:14.31. She then improved on this again in the final, coming from behind in the final length to win the gold medal and set a time of 2:12.63, a Paralympic record.

In 2013 Applegate again represented Great Britain when she travelled to Montreal to compete in the IPC World Championships. There she won three medals including a gold in the 200m freestyle. She also took silver in the 200m medley and
bronze in the 100m freestyle.

Applegate represented Great Britain in the 2016 Paralympics in Rio where she won a silver in the women's 200m freestyle S14 and women's 200m individual medley SM14 and a bronze in the women's 100m backstroke S14.

She was selected for her third Paralympics when she was selected for the postponed 2020 Tokyo Paralympics in July 2021. In Tokyo, she won gold in the mixed 4 x 100m freestyle relay S14 and bronze in the women's 200m freestyle S14 and 100m backstroke S14.

See also
 2012 Olympics gold post boxes in the United Kingdom

References

External links
 
 
 

1996 births
Living people
English female swimmers
British female freestyle swimmers
British female medley swimmers
S14-classified Paralympic swimmers
Paralympic swimmers of Great Britain
Paralympic gold medalists for Great Britain
Paralympic silver medalists for Great Britain
Paralympic bronze medalists for Great Britain
Paralympic medalists in swimming
Swimmers at the 2012 Summer Paralympics
Swimmers at the 2016 Summer Paralympics
Swimmers at the 2020 Summer Paralympics
Medalists at the 2012 Summer Paralympics
Medalists at the 2016 Summer Paralympics
Medalists at the 2020 Summer Paralympics
Medalists at the World Para Swimming Championships
Medalists at the World Para Swimming European Championships
Members of the Order of the British Empire
Sportspeople from Great Yarmouth
Competitors in athletics with intellectual disability
Sportspeople with autism
Swimmers at the 2022 Commonwealth Games
Commonwealth Games medallists in swimming
Commonwealth Games silver medallists for England
Medallists at the 2022 Commonwealth Games